Soterias are a community service that provides a space for people experiencing mental distress or crisis. Based on a recovery model, common elements of the Soteria approach include primarily non-medical staffing; preserving residents personal power, social networks, and communal responsibilities, and no or minimal use of antipsychotic medication (with any medication taken from a position of choice and without coercion).

Soterias are open with no restraint facilities. Loren Mosher, who founded the first Soteria believes his work has shown that it is possible to treat acute psychosis without restraint methods.

Soteria houses are often seen as gentler alternatives to a psychiatric hospital system perceived as authoritarian, hostile or violent and based on routine use of psychiatric (particularly antipsychotic) drugs. Soteria houses are sometimes used as "early intervention" or "crisis resolution" services.

Theoretical model 
Former patients declared that they needed "love and food and understanding, not drugs", and the Soteria Project was meant to compare results of the methods. Most psychiatric wards function according to the medical model. Doctors possess decision-making powers and final authority; primary therapeutic value is attached to drugs used extensively; patients are considered as having an illness, with concomitant disability and dysfunction which should be "treated" and "cured"; labeling and its consequences, namely stigmatization and objectification, are almost inevitable. At Soterias, in contrast, the primary focus was on development, learning, and growth.

History
The original Soteria Research Project was founded by psychiatrist Loren Mosher in San Jose, California, in 1971. A replication facility ("Emanon") opened in 1974 in another suburban San Francisco Bay Area city. Loren Mosher was influenced by the philosophy of moral treatment, previous experimental therapeutic communities (such as the Fairweather Lodges), the work of Harry Stack Sullivan, and Freudian psychoanalysis. The name Soteria comes from the Greek Σωτηρία for "salvation" or "deliverance" (see Soter).

Mosher's first Soteria house specifically selected unmarried subjects between the ages of 18 and 30 who had recently been diagnosed as meeting the DSM-II criteria for schizophrenia. Staff members at the house were encouraged to treat residents as peers and to share household chores. The program was designed to create a quiet, calming environment that respected and tolerated individual differences and autonomy. There was also an ethos of shared responsibility for the running of the house and playing a part in a mutually-supportive community, with the distinction between experts and non-experts downplayed (similar to therapeutic communities). Psychotropic medications, including anti-psychotics, were not completely rejected and were used in some circumstances. The Soteria staff, compared to staff in other psychiatric services, were found to possess significantly more intuition, introversion, flexibility, and tolerance of altered states of consciousness.

The Soteria project was admired by many professionals around the world who aspired to create mental health services based on a social model as opposed to a medical model. It was also heavily criticized as irresponsible or ineffective. The US Soteria Project closed as a clinical program in 1983 due to lack of financial support, although it became the subject of research evaluation with competing claims and analysis. Second-generation US successors to the original Soteria house called Crossing Place are still active, although more focused on medication management.

A first European near-replication of the original Soteria approach was implemented in 1984 in Bern, Switzerland, on a somewhat different conceptual basis. Three Soteria-like environments focused on longer rehabilitation were created in Sweden (Perris, 1989).

Writing in 1999, Mosher described the core of Soteria as "the 24 hour a day application of interpersonal phenomenologic interventions by a nonprofessional staff, usually without neuroleptic drug treatment, in the context of a small, homelike, quiet, supportive, protective, and tolerant social environment." More recent adaptions sometimes employed professional staff. The Soteria approach has traditionally been applied to the treatment of those given a diagnosis of schizophrenia.

Current Soteria work

Soteria or Soteria-based houses are currently run in Sweden, Finland, Germany, Switzerland, Hungary, the United States, as well as other countries.

"Soteria Bern" located in the center of Bern, began operations on May 1 1984, in a 12-room house surrounded with a garden. In the house, a maximum of 6—8 patients, and two nurses, can be accommodated. 

The following criteria was required for patients to be admitted:
 Aged 17–35;
 A recent onset of schizophreniform or schizophrenic psychosis defined by using DSM-III-R criteria, not more than one year before admission;
 At least two of the following six symptoms within the previous four weeks: severely deviant social behaviors, schizophrenic disorders of affect, catatonia, thought disorders, hallucinations, delusions.

Research at Soteria Bern found that most acute schizophrenia patients can be as successfully treated as by standard hospital proceedings, but with significantly lower doses of anti-psychotics and without higher daily costs. Some advantages of the Soteria model may be found at the subjective-emotional, familial and social level.

In the context of increasing interest in the Soteria approach in the United Kingdom, several European countries, North America, and Australasia, a review of controlled trials suggested the Soteria paradigm yields equal, and in certain specific areas better, results in the treatment of people diagnosed with first- or second-episode schizophrenia spectrum disorders (and with considerably lower use of medication) when compared with conventional, medication-based approaches. A re-evaluation of the approach was called for. Soteria has been called a forerunner of contemporary post-psychiatric and critical psychiatry approaches.

See also

 Deinstitutionalization
 Therapeutic community

Notes

References

External links

 

Video  of  Robert Whitaker and Loren Mosher discussing the evidence for the Soteria model.
Website on Soteria started by Loren Mosher.
Soteria Foundation A Hungarian Soteria organization that provides multiple services to people with mental health problems and their families and communities.
UK Soteria Network planning Soteria houses in the UK.
 

Schizophrenia
Anti-psychiatry
Treatment of mental disorders